Limedale is an unincorporated community in Independence County, Arkansas, United States.

It was named for the lime produced there.

References

Unincorporated communities in Independence County, Arkansas
Unincorporated communities in Arkansas